The Mid-Atlantic Hockey League (MAHL) was a minor professional ice hockey league in the Mid-Atlantic and Great Lakes regions of the United States.  The league began play in November 2007. The league was a low level league designed to help ex junior and college players gain pro experience and exposure and move up to higher level leagues.

First season
The league cancelled the remainder of the 2007-08 season and suspended operations on February 12, 2008, declaring the Indiana Ice Miners league champions.  The MAHL hoped to return with teams in new locations in 2008-09. League president Andrew Haines (the same Andrew Haines who owned the American Indoor Football League and currently owns the United Indoor Football League) assured that the league would return to action for the 2008-09 season;Jim Riggs was the commissioner of the MAHL.

Off season activity
The league hoped to expand to between eight and twelve teams, and advertised employment positions for expansion teams in Indiana, Ohio, and Michigan. Despite stating that the Jamestown and Valley Forge franchises were the most financially solvent, the league announced that Valley Forge would not return to play in 2008, and on March 18 announced that the Jamestown Vikings would be relocated to Ohio to become the Lake Erie Vikings, citing an infamous vandalism incident that made national headlines as reason for the move. On March 11, 2008, the league announced the first expansion team, the South Shore Shooters, based in Dyer, Indiana. Under new ownership and a new head coach, the Indiana Ice Miners planned to return. In April, the league announced the team from Wooster, Ohio would relocate to Trenton, Michigan, and play as the Trenton Warriors. The league also signed a television deal with Fanz TV, a syndication service, but this was never broadcast. Expansion franchises in Battle Creek and Chelsea, Michigan were also announced.

MAHL folded
In August 2008, Andrew Haines sold the league ownership to Andrew Miller. But after touring league teams, Miller and his legal team sought to abandon the contract with Haines. Miller took his Battle Creek, Michigan franchise to the All American Hockey Association. The South Shore Shooters also joined the AAHA, and the league folded.

2007–08 teams

2007–08 season

Standings

2008–09 teams
The following teams were scheduled to play the 2008-09 season before the league folded.

References

External links
MAHL Hockey.com
Fanz-TV Official Broadcaster

 
Defunct ice hockey leagues in the United States
Minor league ice hockey
2007–08 in American ice hockey by league